The 1947–48 Nationalliga A season was the 10th season of the Nationalliga A, the top level of ice hockey in Switzerland. Seven teams participated in the league, and HC Davos won the championship.

Standings

External links
 Championnat de Suisse 1947/48

Swiss
National League (ice hockey) seasons
1947–48 in Swiss ice hockey